Darbhanga district is one of the thirty-eight districts of Bihar state in eastern India, and Darbhanga city is the administrative headquarters of this district and 5th largest city of Bihar as well. Darbhanga district is a part of Darbhanga Division. The district is bounded on the north by Madhubani district, on the south by Samastipur district, on the east by Saharsa district and on the west by Sitamarhi and Muzaffarpur districts.

History
1976 saw the creations of two districts from Darbhanga's territory: Madhubani and Samastipur.

Block and circle

 Darbhanga Assembly constituency 
 Baheri Assembly constituency 
 Biraul Assembly constituency
 Keoti Assembly constituency 
 Singhwara Assembly constituency
 Jale Assembly constituency 
 Bahadurpur Assembly constituency 
 Benipur Assembly constituency
 Manigachhi Assembly constituency 
 Kusheshwar Asthan 
 Kusheshwar Asthan Purbi 
 Hanuman nagar Assembly constituency
 Gaura Bauram Assembly constituency 
 Hayaghat Assembly constituency 
 Alinagar Assembly constituency 
 Ghanshyampur Assembly constituency 
 Taradih Assembly constituency
 Kiratpur Assembly constituency

Geography

Economy
In 2006, the Ministry of Panchayati Raj named Darbhanga one of the country's 250 most backward districts (out of a total of 640). It is one of the 36 districts in Bihar currently receiving funds from the Backward Regions Grant Fund Programme (BRGF).

Demographics

According to the 2011 census Darbhanga district has a population of 3,937,385, roughly equal to the nation of Liberia or the US state of Oregon. This gives it a ranking of 64th in India (out of a total of 640). Its population growth rate over the decade 2001-2011 was 19%. Literacy rate of the district is 56.56% (male 66.83%, female 45.24%). 9.74% of the population lives in urban areas. Scheduled Castes and Scheduled Tribes make up 15.64% and 0.07% of the population respectively.

At the time of the 2011 Census of India, 72.75% of the population in the district spoke Maithili, 20.67% Urdu and 5.96% Hindi as their first language.

Politics 
Currently Gopal Jee Thakur of Bhartiya Janta Party is the Member of Parliament from Darbhanga Lok Sabha Constituency.

|}

See also

References

External links
 Darbhanga district website

 
Populated places in Mithila, India
Darbhanga division
Minority Concentrated Districts in India
Districts of Bihar